During the 1985–86 English football season, Reading F.C. competed in the Football League Third Division where they finished in 1st position with 94 points. Reading set a new league record during the season for the most consecutive wins from the start of a season (13).

Squad

Results
Reading's score comes first

Legend

Football League Division Three

Table

FA Cup

League Cup

Associate Members Cup

Squad statistics

Appearances and goals

|}

Top scorers

See also
1985–86 in English football

References

Reading 1985–86 season at Royalsrecord.co.uk

Reading F.C. seasons
Reading
Reading F.C.